The coat of arms of the Republic of Croatia consists of one main shield and five smaller shields which form a crown over the main shield. The main coat of arms is a checkerboard (chequy) that consists of 13 red and 12 white fields. It is also informally known in Croatian as šahovnica ("chessboard", from šah, "chess"). The five smaller shields represent five different historical regions within Croatia.

Official description
Croatian law describes the coat of arms as follows:

The coat of arms of the Republic of Croatia is the historical Croatian coat of arms in the form of a shield twice divided horizontally and vertically into twenty-five red and white (silver) fields, so that the first field in the upper left corner is red. Above the shield lies a crown with five spikes, slightly arched with its ends conjoined with upper left and right parts of the shield. Within the crown, five lesser shields with historical Croatian coats of arms, lined from left to right in the following order: the oldest known Croatian coat of arms, coats of arms of the Dubrovnik Republic, Dalmatia, Istria and Slavonia. The ratio of height of the field of the main shield to the height of the smaller shields in the crown is 1:2.5, and of the width of the field of the main shield to the width of the smaller shields in the crown is 1:1. The oldest known coat of arms of Croatia contains in a shield on a light blue field a yellow (golden) six-pointed star with a white (silver) crescent. Coat of arms of the Republic of Dubrovnik contains in a shield on a blue field two red bars. The Dalmatian arms contain in a shield on a light blue field three yellow (golden) crowned lion heads. The Istrian arms contain in a shield on a blue field a yellow (golden) goat facing left with red hooves and horns. The Slavonian arms contain on a light blue field two horizontal white (silver) bars, between bars a red field, on which sneaks a weasel to the left. In the upper light blue field is a yellow (golden) six-pointed star. The coat of arms is lined red.

History

The checkerboard coat of arms (šahovnica) is first attested as an official symbol of the Kingdom of Croatia on an Innsbruck tower depicting the emblem of Maximilian I, Archduke of Austria in 1495. It appeared on a seal from the Cetingrad Charter that confirmed the 1527 election of Ferdinand I, Archduke of Austria as king of Croatia in Cetin.

The origin of the design has often been purported as being medieval. Historic tradition states it to be the arms of  Stephen Držislav in the 10th century. A Split stone baptistry from the time of Peter Krešimir IV (r. 1058–1074/5) has engraved falcons that carry something that resembles a chequy on their wings, and the bell tower  of the medieval Church of St. Lucy, Jurandvor has a checkerboard pattern carved onto it.

The size of the checkerboard ranges from 3×3 to 8×8, but most commonly 5×5, like in the current design. It was traditionally conjectured that the colours originally represented Red Croatia and White Croatia, but there is no historical evidence to support this.

Towards the Late Middle Ages the distinction for the three crown lands (Croatia proper, Dalmatia, Slavonia) was made. The šahovnica was used as the coat of arms of Croatia proper & together with the shields of Slavonia and Dalmatia was often used to represent the whole of Croatia in Austria-Hungary. It was used as an unofficial coat of arms of the Kingdom of Croatia adopted in 1848 and as an official coat of arms of the post-1868 Kingdom of Croatia-Slavonia (both unofficially known as Triune Kingdom). The two are the same except for the position of the šahovnica and Dalmatian coat of arms which are switched around & with different crowns used above the shield – the later employing St Stephen's crown (associated with Hungarian kings).

By late 19th century šahovnica had come to be considered a generally recognized symbol for Croats and Croatia and in 1919, it was included in the coat of arms of the Kingdom of Serbs, Croats and Slovenes (later the Kingdom of Yugoslavia) to represent Croats. When the Banovina of Croatia was formed, the šahovnica (chequy gules and argent) was retained as the official symbol.

The  Ustaše regime which had ruled Croatia during the World War II superimposed their ideological symbol, the letter "U" above or around the šahovnica (upper left square white) as the official national symbol during their rule.

After the Second World War, the new Socialist Republic of Croatia became a part of the federal Second Yugoslavia. The šahovnica was included in the new socialist coat of arms.  It was designed in the socialist tradition, including symbols like wheat for peasants and an anvil for workers, as well as a rising sun to symbolize a new morning and a red star for communism.

During the change to multiparty elections in Croatia (as part of the collapse of Communist rule in Eastern Europe from the late 1980s), and prior to the establishment of the current design, the šahovnica, shedding the communist symbols that were the hallmark of Croatia in the second Yugoslavia, reappeared as a stand-alone symbol as both the 'upper left square red' and 'upper left square white' variants. The choice of 'upper left square red' or 'upper left square white' was often dictated by heraldic laws and aesthetic requirements.

The first-field-white variant was adopted by the Republic of Croatia and used briefly in 1990. According to constitutional changes which came into effect on 26 June 1990 the red star in the flag of SR Croatia was to be replaced by the "historical Croatian coat of arms with 25 red and white fields", without specifying order of fields. The first-field-white variant was used at the official flag hoisting ceremony on 25 July and was later occasionally used on par with the first-field-red variant until 21 December 1990 when the current coat of arms was officially adopted.

Current design
On 21 December 1990, the post-socialist government of Croatia, passed a law prescribing the design created by the painter and graphic artist Miroslav Šutej, under the aegis of a commission chaired by Nikša Stančić, then head of the Department of Croatian History at the Faculty of Philosophy, University of Zagreb.

The new design added the five crowning shields which represent the regions of Croatia. They are, from left to right:

Some of the more traditional heraldic pundits have criticized the latest design for various design solutions, such as adding a crown to the coat, varying shades of blue in its even fields, adding the red border around the coat, and using red and blue together. The government has accepted their criticism insofar as not accepting further non-traditional designs for the county coats of arms, but the national symbol has remained intact.

Unlike in many countries, Croatian design more commonly uses symbolism from the coat of arms, rather than from the Croatian flag. This is partly due to the geometric design of the shield which makes it appropriate for use in many graphic contexts (e.g. the insignia of Croatia Airlines or the design of the shirt for the Croatia national football team), and partly because the Pan-Slavic colors are present in many European flags.

Historical versions of the crown arms
Most coats of arms used in the crown on the modern-day coat of arms differ slightly from historically accurate versions.

Gallery

See also 

 Flag of Croatia

References

External links 
 Republic of Croatia – Ministry of Foreign Affairs & European Integration
 Croatian Government website – Flag, Coat-of-Arms and National Anthem
 Croatian Coat of Arms during centuries – Darko Zubrinic, 2005
 Croatia – Coat of Arms – Zeljko Heimer 2000
 Croatia – Proposals for New Flag in 1990 – Flags of The World
 Croatia – Political Flags – Flags of The World
 C. Michael McAdamas: Croatia – Myth and Reality

C
Croatia
National symbols of Croatia
Croatia
Croatia
Croatia
Croatia
Croatia
Croatia